Avanavero Airstrip , near Avanavero, Suriname. It was one of the airstrips constructed in the aftermath of Operation Grasshopper.

Facilities
The Avanavero Airstrip has one unpaved runway. It is built near the Avanavero Falls, locally called Avanavero Vallen or Avanavero Sula.

Airlines and destinations 

Currently, no scheduled services are offered from Kabalebo.
Charter Airlines serving this airport are:

Accidents and incidents 
 On 8 May 1967 a helicopter Agusta-Bell 47J-2A, with Dutch registration PH-VAS made an emergency landing. The helicopter from General Aviation at Rotterdam Airport, the Netherlands was flying from its base Avanavero (SMVO), Suriname under contract for SLM used on a Hydro Electric Power Project for "Bureau Waterkracht Werken". At take off from Avanavero Airfield (SMVO) on an oil supply flight the wind blew the main rotor from PH-VAS into a wooden flag-pole, forcing the Dutch pilot Mr. P.H. Janssen to make an emergency running landing. The damage was small and no injuries occurred.

See also

 List of airports in Suriname
 Transport in Suriname

References

External links
OpenStreetMap - Avanavero Airstrip

Airports in Suriname
Sipaliwini District